This list of the mountain groups in the Eastern Alps shows all 75 mountain groups and chains in the Eastern Alps as per the Alpine Club classification of the Eastern Alps (AVE) of 1984.

The Alpine Clubs divide the Eastern Alps into four regions which, in turn, are subdivided into mountain groups. The four regions are the Northern, Central, Southern, and Western (Eastern) Alps. With 27 groups each the Northern and Central regions of the Eastern Alps form the greater part of the Eastern Alps. There are 15 groups in the Southern Eastern Alps and six in the Western Eastern Alps.

The Eastern Alps lie on the territories of six countries: Germany, Italy, Liechtenstein, Austria, Switzerland and Slovenia. Austria has the largest share with 57 mountain groups within its borders. It is followed by Italy with 23 and Switzerland with ten. There are 7 mountain groups In Germany and 4 in Slovenia. Liechtenstein share part of one group.

The only four-thousander and highest mountain of the Eastern Alps is the Piz Bernina at 4,049 m. The Bernina Group is thus the highest of all the Eastern Alpine groups. Next come the Ortler Alps with the Ortler (3,905 m) as the highest peak in South Tyrol. The third-highest group is the Glockner Group with the highest summit in Austria: the Großglockner (3,798 m). Another 22 groups reach a height of over 3,000 metres. The only group in the Northern Eastern Alps with a three thousander is the Lechtal Alps with its Parseierspitze (3,036 m). Another 39 groups are over 2,000 metres high. Several of the groups exceed 1,000 metres and only one lies below this level: the Vienna Woods. Its highest mountain, the Schöpfl, is only 893 m high.

Legend 
AVE No.: the numbering of the group based on the Alpine Club classification (AVE). Numbers suffixed with lower case letters are groups that were further subdivided in 1984. These groups were part of a single unit before 1984.
Name: name of the mountain group. Where names comprise two groups and where there are 2 articles in Wikipedia, both are shown.
Map: Location map of the group in the Eastern Alps
Location: the region within with the group falls
Country: the country or countries within whose territory the mountain group lies. The country listed first is the one that contains the largest area of the mountain group.
Highest mountain: name of the highest mountain in the group. If a group comprises two subgroups, the highest peak of both groups are named. The higher mountain is listed first.
Height: height of the highest mountain in metres
Image: image of the highest mountain

AVE 1984 
By clicking the symbol in the header of a given column, the table will be sorted by that column.

1 In 1984, counted as part of the Dolomites (52) and the Southern Carnic Alps (57b).
2 Regions that do not describe the Eastern Alps. The AVE number was used by the German and Austrian Alpine Clubs in the sorting key of their hut guides.

Literature 
 Franz Graßler: Alpine Club classification of the Eastern Alps (AVE). In: DAV, OeAV, AVS (ed.): Berg '84. Alpine Club Yearbook, Vol. 108, 1984, pp. 215–224,

External links 

Alpine Club classification of the Eastern Alps with boundaries of the individual regions

Eastern Alps
!
Alpine Club classification of the Eastern Alps